Alfred L. Thwing (April 1, 1876 – August 24, 1945) was an American lawyer and politician.

Thwing was born in Fond du Lac, Wisconsin. He moved to Minnesota in 1887 and lived in Minneapolis, Minnesota and in Duluth, Minnesota. Thwing went to the Duluth public schools. He received his law degree from University of Minnesota Law School in 1899 and was admitted to the Minnesota bar. In 1901, he moved to Grand Rapids, Itasca County, Minnesota. Thwing lived in Grand Rapids, Minnesota with his wife and family and practiced law in Grand Rapids. He served in the Minnesota Senate from 1923 to 1930, as Itasca County Attorney in 1906, and as probate clerk in Duluth, Minnesota from 1899 to 1901. Thwing then served as judge of the Minnesota District Court from 1930 until his death in 1945.

References

1876 births
1945 deaths
Politicians from Fond du Lac, Wisconsin
Politicians from Duluth, Minnesota
Lawyers from Minneapolis
Politicians from Minneapolis
People from Grand Rapids, Minnesota
University of Minnesota Law School alumni
Minnesota state court judges
Minnesota state senators